Reynaldo "Rey" Cuenco (March 17, 1960 – August 15, 1996) was a Filipino former professional basketball player in the Philippine Basketball Association.

Career highlights

A native of Pampanga, Rey became part of the Masagana 99 team in the PABL. He was also a NCC player under coach Ron Jacobs, which participated in the PBA during the 1984 season.

Cuenco was one of the most feared power forwards of his generation. He was a big man who was big enough to post up people but at the same time was quick enough to elude the raised hands poised to block him. He also had a decent range and was an efficient rebounder.

He was taken first overall by the Alaska Milkmen, then the newest team in the PBA, in 1986 rookie draft. After his stint with the Milkmen, he spent two seasons with Shell, and was traded to Añejo for the rights of Romeo Dela Rosa in 1989. Under the tutelage of playing-coach Robert Jaworski, he would enjoy superstar status and eventually become one of the best center/power forwards in the league.

Playing for the National Team

Cuenco was a member of the 1982 RP Youth Team that defeated China in the 1982 ABC Youth Championship gold medal match in Manila.  He was also part of the all-pro squad that represented the Philippines in the 1990 Asian Games and won the silver medal.

Death

Cuenco died of a liver ailment in 1996.

References

1960 births
1996 deaths
Alaska Aces (PBA) players
Asian Games medalists in basketball
Asian Games silver medalists for the Philippines
Barangay Ginebra San Miguel players
Basketball players at the 1990 Asian Games
Centers (basketball)
Deaths from cirrhosis
Medalists at the 1990 Asian Games
Philippine Basketball Association All-Stars
Philippines men's national basketball team players
Filipino men's basketball players
Power forwards (basketball)
Shell Turbo Chargers players
TNT Tropang Giga players
Alaska Aces (PBA) draft picks